SCCL, sccl or other capitalisations, may refer to:

 Societat Cooperativa Catalana Limitada, SCCL, s.c.c.l. (also s.coop.c.l), a type of business entity (Catalonia, Spain)
 Singareni Collieries Company, SCCL, Indian coal mining company
 Single Comb Clean Legged (SCCL), description within the American Standard of Perfection poultry standard
 Swiss Cancer Centre Lausanne, in Switzerland
 IATO code for Caldera Airport, Chile (List of airports in Chile)